David William Telgheder (born November 11, 1966) is an American former Major League Baseball (MLB) pitcher who played for the New York Mets and Oakland Athletics from 1993 to 1998.

Early life and amateur career
Telgedher was born in New York to Bill and Ruth Telgedher and raised on the fruit farm his parents owned in Slate Hill, New York. As a youth, he idolized Catfish Hunter and Ron Guidry and was a fan of the New York Yankees "until Steinbrenner started trading everybody," including Chris Chambliss, Graig Nettles and Sparky Lyle.

Telgheder attended the University of Massachusetts Amherst, and in 1987 he played collegiate summer baseball with the Harwich Mariners of the Cape Cod Baseball League. He was selected by the Mets in the 31st round of the 1989 MLB Draft.

Professional career
In 1999 he pitched for the Buffalo Bisons in the Cleveland Indians organization.

Coaching and broadcasting career
He is currently an assistant principal and pitching coach for his alma mater, Minisink Valley High School in Slate Hill, New York. He also serves as a color commentator for Time Warner Cable 6 broadcasts of Hudson Valley Renegades baseball games.

Personal
He currently resides in Minisink, New York as a school principal with his wife Barbara and two children: Carly and Nick.

References

External links

Ultimate Mets Database - Dave Telgheder

1966 births
Living people
American expatriate baseball players in Canada
American sports announcers
Baseball coaches from New York (state)
Baseball players from New York (state)
Buffalo Bisons (minor league) players
Columbia Mets players
Edmonton Trappers players
Harwich Mariners players
Major League Baseball pitchers
Minor League Baseball broadcasters
Modesto A's players
New York Mets players
Norfolk Tides players
Oakland Athletics players
People from Middletown, Orange County, New York
Pittsfield Mets players
St. Lucie Mets players
Tidewater Tides players
UMass Minutemen baseball players
Isenberg School of Management alumni
Williamsport Bills players
High school baseball coaches in the United States
New York Institute of Technology alumni
LIU Post alumni